A  is a Japanese person of foreign descent or heritage, who was born outside Japan and later acquired Japanese citizenship. This category encompasses persons of both Japanese and non-Japanese descent. The former subcategory is considered because of intricacies of national and international laws regarding the citizenship of newborn persons.

Legal issues

By Japanese law, adults generally cannot hold both foreign citizenship and Japanese citizenship (i.e. dual nationality is not recognized): 
those who have acquired dual nationality before age 20 must choose a single nationality before reaching age 22.
those who have acquired dual nationality after age 20 must choose a single nationality in 2 years.

Many who naturalize as Japanese also adopt a Japanese name, since names must be chosen from a list of approved kanji.  Chinese or Koreans with kanji-character names may or may not have problems in this regard.

No law forbids a foreign-born Japanese to be elected as a member of Diet; Marutei Tsurunen (born Martti Turunen in Finland) is Japan's first European foreign-born member of the Diet. Theoretically, therefore, a foreign-born Japanese can become the Prime Minister of Japan.

Probably because of the difficulty in gaining citizenship and because of cultural difference, foreign-born Japanese people account for a very small percentage of the population in Japan.  Many who were born and live in Japan permanently, particularly Korean and Chinese, do not naturalize.  There has been a constant discussion among the government and lawmakers whether to expand their rights of permanent residence to include provisions such as the right to vote in elections, etc.  Few statistics are kept on how many Chinese and Koreans have naturalized, as such statistics are not maintained by the Japanese government.  Once such a person naturalizes, they are, for all intents and purposes under the law, Japanese.

The Japanese jus sanguinis policy contrasts with other countries, such as in Americas where people born natively (under jus solis) acquire citizenship on birth.

Japanese by naturalization
 Akebono Taro (b. Chad Rowan), sumo wrestler
 Bobby Ologun, TV talent
 Chen Kenmin, TV chef
 Sergio Ariel Escudero, football player
 Ofer Feldman, scholar of Japanese political psychology
 Tomokazu Harimoto, table-tennis player 
 Dido Havenaar, football player
 Mike Havenaar, football player
 Hoshitango Imachi, sumo wrestler
 Koizumi Yakumo (b. Lafcadio Hearn), Meiji-era author
 Konishiki Yasokichi (b. Saleva'a Fuauli Atisano'e), sumo wrestler
 Kotoōshū Katsunori (b. Kaloyan Mahlyanov), sumo wrestler
 Wagner Lopes (b. Wagner Augusto Lopes), football player
 Miura Anjin (b. William Adams), Edo-era mariner
 Erikson Noguchipinto, football player
 Debito Arudou (b. David Schofill ne Aldwinckle), blogger
 Ruy Ramos (b. Ruy Gonçalves Ramos Sobrinho), soccer player
 Rikidōzan (b. Kim Sin-Nak), wrestler
 Kenny Omega, professional wrestler
 J. R. Sakuragi (b. Milton "J.R." Henderson), basketball player
 Ademir Santos, football player
 Alessandro Santos (b. Alessandro dos Santos), football player
 Marcos Sugiyama, volleyball player 
 Takamiyama Daigoro, (b. Jesse James Wailani Kuhaulua), sumo wrestler
 Marutei Tsurunen (b. Martti Turunen), politician
 Batara Eto, co-founder of mixi
 Donald Keene (also known as Donarudo Kiin), scholar and translator of Japanese literature and culture

Japanese born abroad 
 Takeshi Kaneshiro, actor
 Hikaru Utada, singer
 Luiz Gushiken
 Mina, singer in South Korean group Twice
 Daisuke Ishiwatari, game designer
 Children of the Japanese abducted to North Korea during the 1970s–80s. Although the children had Korean names at birth, they were registered as Japanese and given Japanese names when they arrived in Japan along with their returning parents.

See also
 Ethnic issues in Japan
 Dekasegi

Lists of Japanese people
τ
Society of Japan
Ethnic groups in Japan
+